Fin District is a district (bakhsh) in Bandar Abbas County, Hormozgan Province, Iran. At the 2006 census, its population was 23,514, in 5,709 families.  The District has one city, Fin, and three rural districts (dehestan): Fin Rural District, Gohreh Rural District, and Siyahu Rural District.

References 

Districts of Hormozgan Province
Bandar Abbas County